Wheeler Road is a  major highway in the east-central part of the U.S. state of Georgia, traveling through the southeastern part of Columbia County and the northeastern part of Richmond County. For its entire length, it is an urban corridor of the Augusta metropolitan area. It connects Evans and Martinez with Augusta. Even though Georgia does not sign its county highways, except for on green street signs, Wheeler Road is Columbia County Route 573 (CR 573).

It is named for Joseph Wheeler, an American military commander and politician. He had the rare distinction of serving as a general during wartime for two opposing forces: first as a noted general in the cavalry of the Confederate States Army in the 1860s during the American Civil War, and later as a general in the United States Army during both the Spanish–American War and Philippine–American War near the turn of the twentieth century. For much of the Civil War, he served as the senior cavalry general in the Army of Tennessee and fought in most of its battles in the Western Theater. Between the Civil War and the Spanish–American War, Wheeler served multiple terms as a United States Representative from the state of Alabama.

Route description
Wheeler Road begins at an intersection with Georgia State Route 383 (SR 383; South Belair Road) on the Evans–Martinez line in the southeastern part of Columbia County, where the roadway continues as South Old Belair Road. At the intersection with the southern terminus of Hardy Road, it curves back to the northeast. It then intersects the southern terminus of Flowing Wells Road (CR 164) and the western terminus of Mason McKnight Jr. Parkway. Here, Wheeler Road turns to the right and travels to the south-southeast. Immediately, it has an interchange with Interstate 20 (I-20; Carl Sanders Highway). Within this interchange, the road enters Richmond County (and the city limits of Augusta) and curves to the southeast.

Wheeler Road travels just south of Doctors Hospital. Just southeast of the hospital is an intersection with both the southern terminus of Medical Center Drive, which leads to the hospital itself, and the northern terminus of Augusta West Parkway, which mostly serves as a frontage road for the western side of I-520 (Bobby Jones Expressway). Here, the roadway curves to the east-northeast. Just over  later, Wheeler Road has an interchange with I-520. On the eastern side of the interstate is an intersection with the southern terminus of Robert C. Daniel Jr. Parkway and the northern terminus of Marks Church Road, the latter serving as a frontage road for the eastern side of I-520. The highway travels just to the south-southeast of Augusta Exchange, a regional retail park. At an intersection with Walton Way Extension, the road narrows from four lanes to two. After that intersection, it transitions into a more residential corridor. Just west of an intersection with the southern terminus of Regent Drive, the highway gradually curves to the east-southeast and travels between Langford Middle School, Tutt Middle School, and Westminster Schools of Augusta. Wheeler Road skirts along the southern edge of Big Oak Park and Westover Memorial Cemetery. Between Augusta University's Summerville campus and the Augusta Country Club, the road meets its eastern terminus, an intersection with Weed Street.

History

Major intersections

See also

References

Streets and parkways in the Augusta metropolitan area
Transportation in Columbia County, Georgia
Transportation in Richmond County, Georgia